Heikant is a former hamlet in the Dutch province of North Brabant. It was located about 1 km west of Vught.

The hamlet is mentioned by the 19th-century historian A.J. van der Aa. He mentions a windmill and three mansions: Eykenheuvel, Kraaijenstein, and De Braken. On March 18, 1837, a farm burnt down, killing 14 cattle and 3 horses.

Heikant should not be confused with any of the other hamlets named Heikant in the Netherlands.

References

Populated places in North Brabant
Vught